The 2017 Archery World Cup is the 12th edition of the international archery circuit organised annually by the World Archery Federation.

Calendar

Results

Recurve

Men's individual

Women's individual

Men's team

Women's team

Mixed team

Compound

Men's individual

Women's Individual

Men's team

Women's team

Mixed team

Medals table

References

Archery World Cup
World
Sport in Antalya
International archery competitions hosted by Turkey
2017 in Turkish sport
International archery competitions hosted by Italy
2017 in Italian sport
International archery competitions hosted by Denmark
2017 in Danish sport
International archery competitions hosted by China
2017 in Chinese sport
International archery competitions hosted by Germany
2017 in German sport
International archery competitions hosted by the United States
2017 in American sports
2017 in sports in Utah